A ton is a unit of mass, force, volume, energy or power.

Ton or TON may also refer to:

Organizations 
Proud of the Netherlands (Trots op Nederland), a Dutch political party 
Tajna Organizacja Nauczycielska, "Secret Teaching Organization", in Poland during World War II

People 
Ton (given name), a Dutch short form of Anton
Ton (surname)
Tôn, a Vietnamese surname (equivalent to Sun)

Places

Europe
-ton, a common feature in British toponymy
Ton, Trentino, Italy; a commune
Tôň, a village in Slovakia
Ton Pentre

Elsewhere
Tonga (by ISO 3166 country code)
Ton, Burkina Faso
Ton, Myanmar

Science and technology
 Telegram Open Network, a defunct decentralized computer network
Ton of refrigeration, unit of power of cooling systems
Tonantzintla Catalogue (TON), an astronomical catalogue
Turnover number, a concept in chemical kinetics

Sports 
Ton, a  century in cricket
Ton, a century break in snooker

Other uses 
Ton (society), the British high society during the Regency era
Ton class, used to classify yachts

See also 
 Taun (disambiguation)
Toe (disambiguation)
Toi (disambiguation)
 Tonn (disambiguation)
 Tonne (disambiguation)
Tono (disambiguation)
 Tons (disambiguation)
 Tonton (disambiguation)
Toon (disambiguation)
Tone (disambiguation)